Lee Wai Man (born 18 August 1973), is a former Hong Kong professional football player.

Club career
Lee mainly played as a defender. He has also played in other positions on the field, including goalkeeper when he moved on to this position urgently after his teammate Leung Cheuk Cheung was dismissed in a match. He announced his retirement from professional football at the end of the 2006–07 season.

International career
Lee achieved the Coca-Cola Outstanding Youth Athlete Award when he was 18, the same year as the Hong Kong cyclist Wong Kam Po.
After an impressive performance in his club Eastern, Lee, aged 20, was selected into the final squad for Hong Kong to play in the 1994 World Cup qualifiers. He made his international debut on 23 April 1994 versus Kuwait in a friendly match held in Singapore. Later that year, Lee played all the World Cup qualifier matches (totally 10 matches) for Hong Kong as a left back.

Although Lee was dropped out from Hong Kong between 1998 and 2000, he returned to play in the first East Asian Football Championship preliminary round for the team as a sweeper. He became the captain for Hong Kong from late 2003 to 2006.

Current status
After retirement, Lee became a part-time commentator for TVB. He usually participated in commenting on local football matches and foreign football tournaments, like the highlights of Euro 2008, Olympic Game Men's Football in 2008 as well as the East Asian Games Men's Football Final in 2009. He was also the head coach of Pontic in the 2010–11 season. Many youth players appreciated his coaching, as he is patient and friendly due to the smaller age gap between him and the youth players.

External links

1973 births
Living people
Hong Kong footballers
Hong Kong international footballers
Happy Valley AA players
Hong Kong First Division League players
Eastern Sports Club footballers
Hong Kong Rangers FC players
Sing Tao SC players
Shatin SA players
Mutual FC players
Association football defenders
Hong Kong League XI representative players
Footballers at the 1994 Asian Games
Asian Games competitors for Hong Kong